Milwaukee is an unincorporated community in Lackawanna County, Pennsylvania, United States.

Notes

Unincorporated communities in Lackawanna County, Pennsylvania
Unincorporated communities in Pennsylvania